The 2013–14 Wilkes-Barre/Scranton Penguins season is the franchise's 15th season in the American Hockey League, which began on October 5, 2013. The team saw several roster changes from the previous season, including the loss of its top three scorers.

Off-season
The Wilkes-Barre/Scranton Penguins saw roster changes during the 2013 off-season, including the loss of the previous year's top scorers Chad Kolarik, Trevor Smith and Riley Holzapfel. Other off-season departures included Alex Grant, Derek Nesbitt, Joey Mormina, Warren Peters, and Brad Thiessen. The Penguins signed several new players, including forwards Mike Carman, Chris Conner, Nick Drazenovic, Andrew Ebbett, Pierre-Luc Létourneau-Leblond, Denver Manderson, Christiaan Minella, and Harry Zolnierczyk; defensemen Brendan Mikkelson,  Scott Harrington, Olli Maatta, Peter Merth, Dustin Stevenson, Harrison Ruopp, Nick D'Agostino and Clark Seymour; and goaltenders Peter Mannino, and Eric Hartzell. Also returning this season is Derrick Pouliot, the 19-year-old defenseman who played in a single Penguins playoff the previous year. The team also re-signed forwards Zach Sill, Paul Thompson, and Brian Gibbons. Out of 17 players from the 2012–13 roster with experience in more than 200 professional games, only Tom Kostopoulos and Sill remained this season. Kostopoulos was named the team's new captain.

A Wilkes-Barre/Scranton Penguins Hall of Fame was created to celebrate the team's 15th season, with the inaugural inductions to be two players and a builder who will be voted on by fans, media and personnel. Effective this season, Mike O'Brien became the Penguins' play-by-play announcer, replacing long-time broadcaster Tom Grace. Teddy Richards, who had been the WBS Penguins equipment manager for 11 years, was promoted to the Pittsburgh Penguins staff. Over the summer, WBS Penguins head coach John Hynes ran the on-ice portion of the Pittsburgh Penguins organization's development camp, and later coached the Penguins' prospects in a rookie tournament that started in London, Ontario. They were ultimately eliminated from the tournament by a 3-2 loss against the Chicago Blackhawks' rookies.

Before the preseason began, Wilkes-Barre/Scranton's starting goaltender Jeff Zatkoff temporarily became the Pittsburgh Penguins back-up goalie due to Tomas Vokoun suffering an injury. Following a training camp began on September 21 at Ice Rink at Coal Street Park, the Penguins played four preseason games: two against the Rochester Americans on September 25 and 27, and two against the Hershey Bears on September 28 and 29. Both Rochester match-ups were decided in overtime, with the Penguins losing the first one 3–2, and winning the second 2–1. Cody Sylvester's game-winner was initially waved off by the referee, but upon further review was deemed a good goal. The Penguins also split their preseason series against Hershey. They lost 6–1 in the first game, with Adam Payerl scoring their only goal, but won the second game 2–1, with Samuelsson scoring the game-winner. Manderson and Minella were loaned to ECHL's Wheeling Nailers after the preseason games concluded.

|- align="center" bgcolor="#fcc"
| 1 || September 25 || WB/Scranton || 2–3 ||Rochester ||OT || Chiodo ||0–0–1–0
|- align="center" bgcolor="#cfc"
| 2 || September 27 || Rochester || 1–2 ||WB/Scranton ||OT || Hartzell ||1–0–1–0
|- align="center" bgcolor="#fcc"
| 3 || September 28 || Hershey || 6–1 ||WB/Scranton |||| Chiodo ||1–1–1–0
|- align="center" bgcolor="#cfc"
| 4 || September 29 || Hershey || 1–2 ||WB/Scranton |||| Gill ||2–1–1–0
|-

Regular season

October
Wilkes-Barre/Scranton won their first six games of the season, marking their best start since winning nine straight games in 2010–11. They scored a league-leading 27 goals in the season's first six games, compared to 15 goals in that time the previous season, and they showed particular strength in the third period, where they outscored their opponents 15–4 across the six games. They won their season opener 5–2 against the Bridgeport Sound Tigers on October 5, breaking the tie with two goals 11 seconds apart in the third period. Chris Conner scored two goals, including the game-winner. Wilkes-Barre/Scranton also won their home opener on October 12, defeating the Hershey Bears 3–1 after scoring two goals in the final three minutes. The Penguins defeated the Syracuse Crunch 6–3 the next day, coming back from a 2–1 deficit by scoring five goals in the third period. Kostopoulos scored two power play goals in the game.

Zolnierczyk and Conner, each of whom had three goals in the first three games of the season, were called up to the Pittsburgh Penguins shortly afterward. Wilkes-Barre/Scranton next won three games in as many days from October 18 to 20, including a 3–2 comeback victory over the Worcester Sharks on October 19 in which they scored three goals in the third period, two of which came from Tom Kühnhackl. They also defeated the Manchester Monarchs 4–3 the next day when Mikkelson scored within 22 seconds of the overtime period. Gibbons had two goals and two assists, marking his fourth multi-point game in six games. Forward Jayson Megna was recalled to the Pittsburgh Penguins on October 24, while Conner and Zolnierczyk were sent back down.

Wilkes-Barre/Scranton suffered their first loss of the season on October 25, falling 4–3 to the Binghamton Senators. The Penguins rallied from a 3–1 deficit in the third period to tie the game, bringing their third period rate of outscoring opponents to 17–4, but nevertheless lost in the shootout. Gibbons scored his fifth goal of the season and 14th point, making him the second-leading scorer in the league. The game marked the seventh consecutive game with the Penguins scoring at least three goals, but also the first in which they allowed a power play goal in the first period. Wilkes-Barre/Scranton saw their first regulation loss on October 26 in a 2–1 decision against the Norfolk Admirals. In contrast to their previously strong third periods, the Penguins gave up the tie-breaking goal, took three penalties and failed to capitalize on two power plays. Goalie Eric Hartzell, who had not played a game all season due to an injury, was assigned to ECHL's Wheeling Nailers on October 31.

November
Wilkes-Barre/Scranton won two consecutive games against the Hershey Bears on November 1 and 2, the first time having done so since 2005. The Penguins won the first 3–2 in overtime after Mikkelson scored a power play goal with 25 seconds left in the extra period. Deslauriers also stopped a penalty shot from winger Matt Watkins in overtime. The game marked the third time in four games that the Penguins won after trailing the first two periods. The Penguins won the second Hershey game 4–2, coming back from an early 2–0 deficit after scoring on three of 22 shots in the second period.

Standings

Conference standings

Schedule and results

|-  style="background:#cfc;"
| 1 || 5 || 7:00 PM || WB/Scranton || 5–2 || Bridgeport || || Deslauriers || 7,886 || 1–0–0–0 || 2 
|-  style="background:#cfc;"
| 2 || 12 || 7:05 PM || Hershey || 1–3 || WB/Scranton || || Deslauriers || 7,156 || 2–0–0–0 || 4 
|-  style="background:#cfc;"
| 3 || 13 || 5:00 PM || WB/Scranton || 6–3 || Syracuse || || Deslauriers || 4,049 || 3–0–0–0 || 6 
|-  style="background:#cfc;"
| 4 || 18 || 7:05 PM || Adirondack || 3–6 || WB/Scranton || || Deslauriers || 4,414 || 4–0–0–0 || 8 
|-  style="background:#cfc;"
| 5 || 19 || 7:00 PM || WB/Scranton || 3–2 || Worcester || || Mannino || 5,476 || 5–0–0–0 || 10 
|-  style="background:#cfc;"
| 6 || 20 || 3:00 PM || WB/Scranton || 4–3 || Manchester || OT || Deslauriers || 3,186 || 6–0–0–0 || 12 
|-  style="background:#ffc;"
| 7 || 25 || 7:05 PM || WB/Scranton || 3–4 || Binghamton || SO || Deslauriers || 2,860 || 6–0–0–1 || 13 
|-  style="background:#fcc;"
| 8 || 26 || 7:05 PM || Norfolk || 2–1 || WB/Scranton || || Mannino || 5,205 || 6–1–0–1 || 13 
|-

|-  style="background:#cfc;"
| 9 || 1 || 7:05 PM || Hershey || 2–3 || WB/Scranton || OT || Deslauriers || 5,019 || 7–1–0–1 || 15 
|-  style="background:#cfc;"
| 10 || 2 || 7:00 PM || WB/Scranton || 4–2 || Hershey || || Deslauriers || 8,563 || 8–1–0–1 || 17 
|-  style="background:#ffc;"
| 11 || 6 || 7:05 PM || Syracuse || 4–3 || WB/Scranton || OT || Deslauriers || 4,934 || 8–1–1–1 || 18
|-  style="background:#fcc;"
| 12 || 8 || 7:05 PM || Albany || 6–5 || WB/Scranton ||  || Deslauriers || 5,821 || 8–2–1–1 || 18
|-  style="background:#fcc;"
| 13 || 10 || 3:00 PM || WB/Scranton || 3–4 || Springfield ||  || Deslauriers || 3,825 || 8–3–1–1 || 18
|-  style="background:#cfc;"
| 14 || 15 || 7:00 PM || WB/Scranton || 5–3 || Syracuse ||  || Deslauriers || 5,112 || 9–3–1–1 || 20
|-  style="background:#cfc;"
| 15 || 16 || 7:05 PM || Hershey || 1–3 || WB/Scranton ||  || Deslauriers || 6,008 || 10–3–1–1 || 22
|-  style="background:#cfc;"
| 16 || 20 || 7:05 PM || WB/Scranton || 3–1 || Rochester ||  || Deslauriers || 2,860 || 11–3–1–1 || 24
|-  style="background:#fcc;"
| 17 || 22 || 7:05 PM || St. John's || 2–1 || WB/Scranton ||  || Deslauriers || 4,136 || 11–4–1–1 || 24
|-  style="background:#cfc;"
| 18 || 23 || 7:05 PM || St. John's || 2–5 || WB/Scranton ||  || Hartzell || 5,102 || 12–4–1–1 || 26
|-  style="background:#fcc;"
| 19 || 27 || 7:00 PM || WB/Scranton || 1–3 || Adirondack ||  || Deslauriers || 3,431 || 12–5–1–1 || 26
|-  style="background:#cfc;"
| 20 || 29 || 7:05 PM || Binghamton || 0–1 || WB/Scranton ||  || Hartzell || 5,235 || 13–5–1–1 || 28
|-  style="background:#ffc;"
| 21 || 30 || 7:00 PM || WB/Scranton || 2–3 || Hershey || OT || Deslauriers || 10,081 || 13–5–1–2 || 29
|-  style="background:#;"

|-  style="background:#fcc;"
| 22 || 6 || 7:30 PM || WB/Scranton || 0–5 || St. John's ||  || Hartzell || 6,287 || 13–6–1–2 || 29
|-  style="background:#cfc;"
| 23 || 7 || 7:30 PM || WB/Scranton || 3–0 || St. John's ||  || Deslauriers || 6,287 || 14–6–1–2 || 31
|-  style="background:#fcc;"
| 24 || 11 || 7:05 PM || Springfield || 3–2 || WB/Scranton ||  || Deslauriers || 4,190 || 14–7–1–2 || 31
|-  style="background:#cfc;"
| 25 || 13 || 7:05 PM || Hershey || 3–5 || WB/Scranton ||  || Hartzell || 5,947 || 15–7–1–2 || 33
|-  style="background:#cfc;"
| 26 || 14 || 7:05 PM || Utica || 0–1 || WB/Scranton ||  || Hartzell || 6,492 || 16–7–1–2 || 35
|-  style="background:#fcc;"
| 27 || 20 || 7:05 PM || Worcester || 4–1 || WB/Scranton ||  || Hartzell || 4,121 || 16–8–1–2 || 35
|-  style="background:#cfc;"
| 28 || 21 || 7:05 PM || Syracuse || 1–2 || WB/Scranton ||  || Deslauriers || 6,118 || 17–8–1–2 || 37
|-  style="background:#fcc;"
| 29 || 27 || 7:05 PM || Norfolk || 3–1 || WB/Scranton ||  || Deslauriers || 5,832 || 17–9–1–2 || 37
|-  style="background:#ffc;"
| 30 || 28 || 7:00 PM || WB/Scranton || 1–2 || Hershey || SO || Hartzell || 10,708 || 17–9–1–3 || 38
|-  style="background:#cfc;"
| 31 || 31 || 5:05 PM || Syracuse || 2–5 || WB/Scranton ||  || Deslauriers || 4,581 || 18–9–1–3 || 40
|-

|-  style="background:#cfc;"
| 32 || 3 || 7:00 PM || WB/Scranton || 2–1 || Hartford ||  || Deslauriers || 3,049 || 19–9–1–3 || 42
|-  style="background:#fcc;"
| 33 || 4 || 7:05 PM || Manchester || 4–2 || WB/Scranton ||  || Deslauriers || 7,422 || 19–10–1–3 || 42
|-  style="background:#cfc;"
| 34 || 5 || 4:05 PM || Binghamton || 1–4 || WB/Scranton ||  || Hartzell || 4,162 || 20–10–1–3 || 44
|-  style="background:#fcc;"
| 35 || 8 || 7:05 PM || Syracuse || 4–2 || WB/Scranton ||  || Deslauriers || 3844 || 20–11–1–3 || 44
|-  style="background:#cfc;"
| 36 || 10 || 7:00 PM || WB/Scranton || 4–1 || Adirondack ||  || Deslauriers || 3,802 || 21–11–1–3 || 46
|-  style="background:#cfc;"
| 37 || 11 || 7:05 PM || Hartford || 3–5 || WB/Scranton ||  || Deslauriers || 8,188 || 22–11–1–3 || 48
|-  style="background:#fcc;"
| 38 || 17 || 7:05 PM || WB/Scranton || 1–5 || Providence ||  || Deslauriers || 9,090 || 22–12–1–3 || 48
|-  style="background:#cfc;"
| 39 || 18 || 7:00 PM || WB/Scranton || 4–2 || Portland ||  || Hartzell || 2,961 || 23–12–1–3 || 50
|-  style="background:#cfc;"
| 40 || 19 || 3:05 PM || WB/Scranton || 5–1 || Providence ||  || Hartzell || 7,705 || 24–12–1–3 || 52
|-  style="background:#fcc;"
| 41 || 24 || 7:30 PM || WB/Scranton || 1–4 || Norfolk ||  || Deslauriers || 5,930 || 24–13–1–3 || 52
|-  style="background:#cfc;"
| 42 || 25 || 7:15 PM || WB/Scranton || 2–1 || Norfolk || SO || Hartzell || 6,310 || 25–13–1–3 || 54
|-  style="background:#fcc;"
| 43 || 26 || 5:00 PM || WB/Scranton || 0–2 || Hershey ||  || Hartzell || 9,485 || 25–14–1–3 || 54
|-  style="background:#cfc;"
| 44 || 29 || 7:05 PM || Syracuse || 0–4 || WB/Scranton ||  || Hartzell || 4,574 || 26–14–1–3 || 56
|-  style="background:#fcc;"
| 45 || 31 || 7:05 PM || Norfolk || 2–1 || WB/Scranton ||  || Hartzell || 5,117 || 26–15–1–3 || 56
|-  style="background:#;"

|-  style="background:#fcc;"
| 46 || 1 || 7:05 PM || Rochester || 4–0 || WB/Scranton ||  || Hartzell || 6,902 || 26–16–1–3 || 56
|-  style="background:#cfc;"
| 47 || 7 || 7:05 PM || Portland || 1–5 || WB/Scranton ||  || Hartzell || 4,264 || 27–16–1–3 || 58
|-  style="background:#cfc;"
| 48 || 8 || 7:05 PM || Adirondack || 2–3 || WB/Scranton ||  || Deslauriers || 6,348 || 28–16–1–3 || 60
|-  style="background:#ffc;"
| 49 || 9 || 5:00 PM || WB/Scranton || 3–4 || Hershey || OT || Hartzell || 9,827 || 28–16–2–3 || 61
|-  style="background:#fcc;"
| 50 || 14 || 7:05 PM || WB/Scranton || 2–6 || Binghamton ||  || Hartzell || 3,650 || 28–17–2–3 || 61
|-  style="background:#fcc;"
| 51 || 15 || 7:00 PM || WB/Scranton || 4–5 || Hershey ||  || Deslauriers || 5,896 || 28–18–2–3 || 61
|-  style="background:#fcc;"
| 52 || 16 || 4:05 PM || Hershey || 3–1 || WB/Scranton ||  || Deslauriers || 5,896 || 28–19–2–3 || 61
|-  style="background:#ffc;"
| 53 || 19 || 7:05 PM || Binghamton || 4–3 || WB/Scranton || OT || Deslauriers || 3,815 || 28–19–3–3 || 62
|-  style="background:#ffc;"
| 54 || 22 || 7:05 PM || Providence || 3–4 || WB/Scranton || SO || Deslauriers || 8,183 || 28–19–3–4 || 63
|-  style="background:#cfc;"
| 55 || 25 || 7:05 PM || Hershey || 5–6 || WB/Scranton ||  || Deslauriers || 4,391 || 29–19–3–4 || 65
|-  style="background:#fcc;"
| 56 || 28 || 7:00 PM || WB/Scranton || 0–4 || Syracuse ||  || Deslauriers || 5,045 || 29–20–3–4 || 65
|-  style="background:#;"

|-  style="background:#cfc;"
| 57 || 1* || 5:00 PM || WB/Scranton || 2–1 || Albany ||  || Mannino || 3,019 || 30–20–3–4 || 67
|-  style="background:#ffc;"
| 58 || 7 || 7:00 PM || WB/Scranton || 1–2 || Utica || SO || Mannino || 3,815 || 30–20–3–5 || 68
|-  style="background:#cfc;"
| 59 || 8 || 7:00 PM || WB/Scranton || 4–2 || Hamilton ||  || Mannino || 4,744 || 31–20–3–5 || 70
|-  style="background:#cfc;"
| 60 || 9 || 3:00 PM || WB/Scranton || 4–3 || Toronto || SO || Deslauriers || 5,394 || 32–20–3–5 || 72
|-  style="background:#cfc;"
| 61 || 14 || 7:05 PM || Hamilton || 1–5 || WB/Scranton ||  || Mannino || 5,778 || 33–20–3–5 || 74
|-  style="background:#cfc;"
| 62 || 15 || 7:05 PM || Norfolk || 0–4 || WB/Scranton ||  || Mannino || 7,715 || 34–20–3–5 || 76
|-  style="background:#cfc;"
| 63 || 21 || 7:00 PM || WB/Scranton || 2–0 || Syracuse ||  || Mannino || 5,076 || 35–20–3–5 || 78
|-  style="background:#fcc;"
| 64 || 22 || 7:05 PM || Utica || 2–1 || WB/Scranton ||  || Mannino || 8,163 || 35–21–3–5 || 78
|-  style="background:#cfc;"
| 65 || 23* || 4:00 PM || WB/Scranton || 3–2 || Albany || OT || Deslauriers || 3,431 || 36–21–3–5 || 80
|-  style="background:#fcc;"
| 66 || 26 || 7:05 PM || Providence || 2–1 || WB/Scranton ||  || Mannino || 5,970 || 36–22–3–5 || 80
|-  style="background:#cfc;"
| 67 || 28 || 7:30 PM || WB/Scranton || 2–1 || Norfolk ||  || Mannino || 5,130 || 37–22–3–5 || 82
|-  style="background:#cfc;"
| 68 || 29 || 7:15 PM || WB/Scranton || 2–1 || Norfolk ||  || Mannino || 6,039 || 38–22–3–5 || 84
|-  style="background:#;"
| colspan="11" style="text-align:center;"| * Game to be played in Atlantic City, New Jersey
|-

|-  style="background:#cfc;"
| 69 || 4 || 7:05 PM || WB/Scranton || 3–0 || Bridgeport ||  || Mannino || 6,993 || 39–22–3–5 || 86
|-  style="background:#cfc;"
| 70 || 5 || 7:05 PM || WB/Scranton || 1–0 || Albany || OT || Mannino || 7,905 || 40–22–3–5 || 88
|-  style="background:#fcc;"
| 71 || 6 || 3:05 PM || Binghamton || 6–2 || WB/Scranton ||  || Hartzell || 3,335 || 40–23–3–5 || 88
|-  style="background:#cfc;"
| 72 || 11 || 7:00 PM || Syracuse || 2–3 || WB/Scranton || SO || Vokoun || 4,789 || 41–23–3–5 || 90
|-  style="background:#cfc;"
| 73 || 12 || 7:05 PM || WB/Scranton || 2–1 || Binghamton ||  || Mannino || 8,096 || 42–23–3–5 || 92
|-  style="background:#fcc;"
| 74 || 13 || 4:05 PM || WB/Scranton || 2–3 || Toronto ||  || Vokoun || 6,519 || 42–24–3–5 || 92
|-  style="background:#fcc;"
| 75 || 18 || 7:05 PM || Binghamton || 5–4 || WB/Scranton ||  || Mannino || 3,674 || 42–25–3–5 || 92
|-  style="background:#fcc;"
| 76 || 19 || 7:00 PM || Utica || 2–0 || WB/Scranton ||  || Murray || 3,815 || 42–26–3–5 || 92
|-

|- style="text-align:center;"
| Legend:       = Win       = Loss       = OT/SO Loss

Playoffs

Game log 
The Wilkes-Barre Scranton Penguins entered the Calder Cup playoffs as the 6th seed in the Eastern Conference. They began the playoffs playing the Binghamton Senators where they went on to win the series in 4 games. In the Eastern Conference Semifinals they had a rematch from last season against the Providence Bruins. The series ended in a thrilling Game 7 where the Penguins claimed an early 5–0 lead in the 2nd period and the Bruins scored a shorthanded goal late in the period. They  would add 3 more goals in the 3rd to come within one of tying, but the Penguins were able to hold on and advance to the Eastern Conference Finals for the second straight season.

They faced the St. John's IceCaps in the Eastern Conference Finals where they fell behind 3-1 after game 4. They were able to force a game 6 where they eventually lost 5-0 and the IceCaps won the Richard F. Canning Trophy.

|-  style="background:#cfc;"
| 1 || April 16 || Wilkes-Barre/Scranton || 3–2 || Binghamton || OT || Mannino || 3,016 || 1–0 || Recap
|-  style="background:#fcf;"
| 2 || April 19 || Wilkes-Barre/Scranton || 3–4 || Binghamton || OT || Mannino || 3,306 || 1–1 || Recap
|-  style="background:#cfc;"
| 3 || April 21 || Binghamton || 2–3 || Wilkes-Barre/Scranton || OT || Mannino || 6,237 || 2–1 || Recap
|-  style="background:#cff;"
| 4 || April 23 || Binghamton || 1–5 || Wilkes-Barre/Scranton ||  || Mannino || 6,991 || 3–1 || Recap
|-

|-  style="background:#fcf;"
| 1 || May 2 || Providence || 4–0 || Wilkes-Barre/Scranton ||  || Mannino || 3,170 || 0–1 || Recap
|-  style="background:#cfc;"
| 2 || May 4 || Providence || 1–6 || Wilkes-Barre/Scranton || || Mannino || 3,488 || 1–1 || Recap
|-  style="background:#cfc;"
| 3 || May 5 || Wilkes-Barre/Scranton || 5–4  || Providence || 2OT || Mannino || 2,045 || 2–1 || Recap
|-  style="background:#fcf;"
| 4 || May 7 || Wilkes-Barre/Scranton || 2–3 || Providence || OT || Mannino || 3,188 || 2–2 || Recap
|-  style="background:#cfc;"
| 5 || May 9 || Wilkes-Barre/Scranton || 3–2 || Providence || || Mannino || 2,729 || 3–2 || Recap
|-  style="background:#fcf;"
| 6 || May 11 || Providence || 4–1 || Wilkes-Barre/Scranton || || Mannino || 3,563 || 3–3 || Recap
|-  style="background:#cff;"
| 7 || May 13 || Providence || 4–5 || Wilkes-Barre/Scranton ||  || Mannino || 3,613 || 4–3 || Recap
|-

|-  style="background:#cfc;"
| 1 || May 24 || Wilkes-Barre/Scranton || 3–2 || St. John's ||  || Mannino || 6,287 || 1–0 || Recap
|-  style="background:#fcf;"
| 2 || May 25 || Wilkes-Barre/Scranton || 1–2 || St. John's || || Mannino || 6,287 || 1–1 || Recap
|-  style="background:#fcf;"
| 3 || May 28 || St. John's || 5–0 || Wilkes-Barre/Scranton || || Mannino || 3,553 || 1–2 || Recap
|-  style="background:#fcf;"
| 4 || May 29 || St. John's || 2–1 || Wilkes-Barre/Scranton || || Mannino || 3,382 || 1–3 || Recap
|-  style="background:#cfc;"
| 5 || May 31 || St. John's || 2–4 || Wilkes-Barre/Scranton || || Mannino || 4,660 || 2–3 || Recap
|-  style="background:#fcf;"
| 6 || June 3 || Wilkes-Barre/Scranton || 0–5 || St. John's || || Mannino || 6,287 || 2–4 || Recap
|-

|- 
| Legend:       = If needed       = Win       = Loss       = Playoff series win

Player statistics
Final Stats
Skaters

Goaltenders

†Denotes player spent time with another team before joining team. Stats reflect time with the team only.
‡Left the team mid-season
*Rookie

Milestones

References

External links
Wilkes-Barre/Scranton Penguins official website

Wilkes
Wilkes-Barre/Scranton Penguins
Wilkes